The Alaska Army National Guard is a component of the United States Army and the Alaska Department of Military and Veterans Affairs. Along with the Alaska Air National Guard, it makes up the Alaska National Guard. Alaska Army National Guard units are trained and equipped as part of the United States Army. The same ranks and insignia are used and National Guardsmen are eligible to receive all United States military awards. The Alaska Guard also bestows a number of state awards for local services rendered in or to the state of Alaska.

In 2006, the Alaska Army National Guard was composed of approximately 1850 soldiers and maintained 77 armories and other facilities, including Fort Greely.

History
The Alaska Army National Guard was originally formed in 1940-41. However, since the Second World War, the Alaska Army National Guard had not seen significant overseas deployments. It appears that the 207th Infantry Battalion was active in the state after the Second World War, with its distinctive unit insignia and coat of arms originally approved on 4 June 1952. However it was rescinded (cancelled) on 10 May 1960.

In 1976, the Alaska National Guard asked the WAC (Women's Army Corps) Center to develop and conduct a basic training program for female members of the Guard. The scout battalions of the 297th Infantry, Army National Guard, which patrolled the western border of Alaska, recruited native Alaskan women for duty and it needed a special training program. The WAC Center assigned a team of trainers to the project. "The team visited Alaska, studied the problems involved, returned to Fort McClellan, drew up a course, then returned to Alaska." Fifty-two female recruits participated in the course at Camp Carroll in Anchorage, and fifty-one graduated. The course taught "map reading, marching, communications procedures, intelligence gathering, arctic survival and bivouac, first aid, weapons (M16 rifle), and other subjects." After completing the basic training, the women went to Army training schools outside Alaska for advanced individual training before being assigned for duty with the scout battalions. The course was successful and it was repeated in 1978.

In 2004, a company of infantry was mobilized to serve in Iraq, serving with the Hawaii Army National Guard's 29th Brigade in 2005. In 2005 through 2008 smaller detachments were deployed to both Iraq and Afghanistan. An infantry battalion was deployed to the Middle East in 2006, and another infantry company was deployed to Iraq in 2007. The Alaska Army National Guard's aviation units have seen a series of company-sized rotations to Iraq, including the loss of a helicopter and crew in January 2006.

These deployments seem small in comparison to the units that other states have deployed. However given the small size of Alaska's population and National Guard they represent a very large percentage of the Alaska Army National Guard. When young men are deployed there is a particular impact on smaller "Alaska Bush" villages that have a subsistence lifestyle.

The 49th Missile Defense Battalion (GMD) is an Alaska Army National Guard unit that is permanently on active duty at Fort Greely, as part of the 100th Missile Defense Brigade (GMD).

The Alaska Army National Guard regularly sends soldiers to train in Mongolia as part of the State Partnership Program. In addition, the Mongolian Army deployments to Iraq were typically accompanied by Alaska Army Guard members. Now that the Mongolian Army has shifted its focus to Afghanistan, Alaska National Guard soldiers accompany them there.

In 2007 the original insignia of the 207th Infantry Battalion was readopted for use by the 207th Regiment; the insignia was reinstated and redesignated for the 207th Regiment with the description and symbolism revised on 7 April 1997.(TIOH)

In 2008, the Alaska Guard began transforming the 207th Infantry Group into the modular 297th Battlefield Surveillance Brigade. It had originally been intended to become the 207th Infantry Brigade Combat Team, prior to the National Guard Rebalance Initiative. In addition the 38th Troop Command was stood up to provide command and control for miscellaneous units.

In 2013, media coverage increasingly focused on allegations of misconduct within the Alaska National Guard. These incidents included the dismissal of a senior officer in a high-profile post for failing to control or actively encouraging sexual misconduct among subordinates, as well as allegations of longstanding problems with both sexual assaults within the ranks and a command climate that suppressed reporting of these crimes and targeted whistle blowers for retaliation. By late 2013, the situation had become high-profile enough that the Alaska National Guard leadership appointed a special investigator to pursue inquiries into the pervasive problem of sexual misconduct and the organizational culture and command climate that condoned and promoted it.

Current Units
 In January 2017, the Alaska Army National Guard included the following units:
 Joint Forces Headquarters (Joint Base Elmendorf–Richardson)
 207th Multi-Functional Training Regiment
 Alaska National Guard Medical Detachment
 Alaska National Guard Recruiting and Retention Battalion
 297th Regional Support Group (Joint Base Elmendorf–Richardson)
 208th Construction Management Team 
 207th Engineer Utilities Detachment 
 134th Public Affairs Detachment 
 297th Military Police Company  
 49th Personnel Detachment (Theater Gateway) 
 38th Troop Command (Joint Base Elmendorf–Richardson)
 1st Battalion, 207th Aviation Regiment
 1st Battalion, 297th Infantry Regiment (tactically part of the 29th Infantry Brigade Combat Team of the Hawaii Army National Guard)
 49th Missile Defense Battalion, 100th Missile Defense Brigade, Fort Greely (United States Army Space and Missile Defense Command)
 C Company, 2nd Battalion, 641st Aviation Regiment
 G Company, 2nd Battalion, 104th Aviation Regiment (Medical Evacuation)
 103rd WMD Civil Support Team

See also
Alaska Naval Militia
Alaska State Defense Force

References

External links
 Alaska National Guard, retrieved 20 Nov 2006
 GlobalSecurity.org Alaska Army National Guard, retrieved 20 Nov 2006
 Alaska Department of Military and Veterans Affairs, 2010 Annual Report
Bibliography of Alaska Army National Guard History compiled by the United States Army Center of Military History

United States Army National Guard by state
Military in Alaska
1940 establishments in Alaska